Lake Piomingo is a reservoir in the U.S. state of Mississippi.

Lake Piomingo was named after the Chickasaw chieftain, Piomingo. Many believe this is the home of the legendary “Wet Chub” Squirrel.

References

Piomingo
Rivers of Lee County, Mississippi
Mississippi placenames of Native American origin